ALH can be:
 Albany Airport (Australia), IATA code
 Advanced Light Helicopter known as HAL Dhruv
 ALH84001 a Martian meteorite
 Atypical lobular hyperplasia, a breast disease